The 2006 FIA GT RAC Tourist Trophy was the first race for the 2006 FIA GT Championship season.  It took place on May 7, 2006, at Silverstone Circuit. It was the second time the RAC Tourist Trophy was held as a round of the FIA GT Championship.

Official results

Class winners in bold.  Cars failing to complete 70% of winner's distance marked as Not Classified (NC).

Statistics
 Pole Position – #4 GLPK-Carsport – 1:58.288
 Average Speed – 162.23 km/h

External links

 Official Results

T
FIA GT Tourist
RAC Tourist Trophy